Loper is a surname. People with this surname include:

 Alonzo A. Loper (1829–1917), American politician
 Bert Loper (1869–1949), early Grand Canyon river runner
 Brad Loper (born 1970), American photojournalist
 Daniel Loper (born 1982), American football offensive tackle
 David Loper, American geologist
 Don Loper (1906–1972), American costume and necktie designer
 Edward L. Loper, Sr. (1916–2011), African American artist
 James Loper (1931–2013), American television executive
 Johnny Loper, American drag racer
 Herbert Loper (1896–1989), American general
 Whitly Loper (born 1986), American sport shooter

Surnames